Lake Meredith is a reservoir formed by Sanford Dam on the Canadian River at Sanford, Texas. Sanford Dam was constructed starting in 1962 with completion in 1965. In 2003, the Canadian River Municipal Water Authority announced that it would reduce allocations to its member cities due to an ongoing drought and a continued drop in the water level in the reservoir. As of 2008, the lake continued to hit record lows, and most of the water supplied by CRMWA is now coming from wells in Roberts County. In 2011, water withdrawals from Lake Meredith  temporarily ceased and on August 7, 2013 the lake reached its all-time low . The record high capacity was in April 1973 when the lake was 101.85 ft deep. Lake depth as of October 14, 2017 was 73.12 ft deep.

Lake depth as of June 17, 2019 was 77.03 ft deep.

On June 1, 2008 the remains of a Beechcraft Skipper airplane were found in the receding lake.  The plane, reported missing on January 27, 1984, was on a two-hour flight carrying the pilot, Steven Lampe, 25 and Larry Lucas, both of Amarillo, Texas.  There had been no eyewitnesses to the crash.

Much of the political credit for the establishment of Lake Meredith has gone to the late State Senator Grady Hazlewood of Amarillo.

Recreational activities
Since its designation as a National Recreation Area, Lake Meredith has been an attraction for various recreational activities, including camping, fishing, and water sports of all types. Its long narrow profile and numerous coves make power boat sports (water skiing, tubing, wake boarding, etc.) especially popular. Due to the region's normally windy summer seasons, the coves are popular spots for such water sports due to their natural protection from the winds that often make the open lake waters too choppy for these activities. It also features camping at several sites around the lake, along with five beach areas, one accessible only by boat. Fishing stock includes sand bass and walleye. Anglers may also hope to land several other desirable species of fish such as crappie, perch, carp, large mouth bass, and small mouth bass. The drought from 2011-2013 took a big toll, not only on the water level, but also on the local economy of Fritch, Texas. Lake Meredith is now enjoying recovery due to consecutive rainy seasons since 2014. The reservoir’s water level has risen over fifty feet since the record low was set on August 7, 2013.

Boat ramps are located at Sanford Yake, Cedar Canyon, Fritch Fortress, Harbor Bay, and Blue West. All ramps are open as of June 17, 2019.

See also

Lake Meredith National Recreation Area

References

External links

 
 Canadian River Municipal Water Authority
Lake Meredith, Texas Parks and Wildlife Department

Meredith
Protected areas of Hutchinson County, Texas
Protected areas of Potter County, Texas
Protected areas of Moore County, Texas
Meredith
Dams in Texas
United States Bureau of Reclamation dams
Bodies of water of Hutchinson County, Texas
Bodies of water of Potter County, Texas
Bodies of water of Moore County, Texas
Dams completed in 1965